A board of education, school committee or school board is the board of directors or board of trustees of a school, local school district or an equivalent institution.

The elected council determines the educational policy in a small regional area, such as a city, county, state, or province. Frequently, a board of directors power with a larger institution, such as a higher government's department of education. The name of such board is also often used to refer to the school system under such board's control.

The government department that administered education in the United Kingdom before the foundation of the Ministry of Education was formerly called the Board of Education.

See also 
National Association of State Boards of Education

References